The Christopher Brookner House is a historic house located at 222 North Dixon Avenue in Dixon, Illinois. Original owner Christopher Brookner, a carpenter and early Dixon resident, built the house in 1861 or 1862. The house's design is primarily Italianate, which is reflected in its front porch, tall windows, bracketed cornice, and hipped roof. The Federal style can also be seen in the house, particularly in its window treatments and its simple brick exterior. The main entrance to the house has a Greek Revival design, adding a third style to the house's architecture.

The house was added to the National Register of Historic Places on November 13, 1984.

References

Houses on the National Register of Historic Places in Illinois
Federal architecture in Illinois
Greek Revival architecture in Illinois
Italianate architecture in Illinois
Houses completed in 1862
National Register of Historic Places in Lee County, Illinois
Dixon, Illinois
1862 establishments in Illinois